Kevin Monsalve, also known by his pseudonym GamerKevMo, is a Venezuelan YouTuber and creator of the El Politigato animated shorts series. He is a cartoonist and has also been a professor at the National Film School of Caracas.

Career 
Kevin Monsalve is a cartoonist and has been a professor at the National Film School of Caracas. On 5 March 2018 Kevin started a series of animated shorts called "El Politigato", which delivers social criticism and analysis of the Venezuelan situation with black humor and satire, starring a witty cat arguing with his Chavista owner; the first chapter was dedicated to the Petro token (PTR) launched by Nicolás Maduro. Kevin originally did not expect the project to be successful, but the simple animation allowed him to continue with the production and he has improved his scripts with practice.

By 2020 the series had reached over 50 episodes, published on platforms such as YouTube and Facebook, and has included other characters, including the "MUD Dog" (allusive to the political opposition and its Democratic Unity Roundtable coalition), the "Demented Oppositionist" and "Martin" (a rat with a degree in sociology).

In December 2019 he participated as a speaker in the colloquium "The new generation of visual storytellers", on the second day of the Cocuyo Festival, held at the Metropolitan University of Caracas and supported by the DW Akademie.

References

External links 
 MasKevMo, YouTube channel
 La mente detrás de "El Politigato", el felino más mordaz de Venezuela - El Estímulo, Carol Álvarez, 7 May 2018

Venezuelan YouTubers
Spanish-language YouTubers
Venezuelan male comedians
Living people
Year of birth missing (living people)